Ashby Parkland is a civil parish in North Lincolnshire, England.   The parish was created on 1 April 2004 and was previously part of the Burringham parish.   The parish consists of a few fields and hamlets to the immediate west of Scunthorpe, and to the east of the M181, which marks the border with Burringham.

References

External links
 Boundary map

Civil parishes in Lincolnshire
Borough of North Lincolnshire